SuperTux is a free and open-source two-dimensional platform video game published under the GNU General Public License (GPL). The game was inspired by Nintendo's Super Mario Bros. series; instead of Mario, the hero in the game is Tux, the official mascot of the Linux kernel.

History 
The game was originally created by Bill Kendrick and is maintained by the SuperTux Development Team. It is written mostly in the C++ programming language. Many of the in-game graphics were created by Ingo Ruhnke, author of Pingus.

The game was developed under usage of Simple DirectMedia Layer as cross-platform middlelayer targeting OpenGL and OpenAL. Game engine and physics engine are own developed. The game's metadata are S-Expressions of the programming language Lisp, scripts are written in Squirrel.

Updates 
The development occurs in a series of stable milestones, each one improving steadily upon the last: 

 Versions from 0.0.0 (2000) to 0.0.6 (2003) were betas with only one level called "Antarctica"
 Milestone 1 (versions 0.1.0 to 0.1.3) was released in 2004
 Version 0.3.0 was released on December 17, 2006, and features a whole new forest world.
 Version 0.4.0 was released on December 20, 2015, which features significant improvements to gameplay, all new graphics, a switch to SDL2, and new features.
 Milestone 2 (versions 0.5.0 to 0.5.1) was officially released as stable in 2016. It adds a built-in level editor and temporarily moves the forest worldmap to a "Contributed Levels" tab.
 Version 0.6.0 was released on December 23, 2018 with redesigned Icy Island and Forest, revamped rendering engine and many minor improvements.
 Milestone 3 (versions 0.7.0 to 0.7.1) is planned to release at the end of 2023, which will feature a fully revamped games with new textures for every tile, badguy, character and decal, a ton of new features, including multiplayer, sliding, a world select menu, and revamped powerups
 Version 0.8.0 is planned to introduce a tropical world with volcanos, a temple and 2 new bosses to unlock after Ghosttree is beaten.

On January 13, 2022, SuperTux was released on Steam as an Early Access game.

Gameplay 
Gameplay in SuperTux is similar to Super Mario Bros.. Tux can jump under bonus blocks marked with question marks to gain coins or retrieve power-ups such as the egg, which makes Tux bigger and allows him to take an extra hit before dying. Other objects such as trampolines and invincibility granting stars can also be obtained from these blocks. Tux can defeat some bad guys by jumping on them, and most can be defeated or frozen by shooting bullets after collecting a fire flower or an ice flower. Earth flowers grant Tux a miner helmet with a spotlight for dark areas and can give invincibility for a few seconds, and air flowers allow Tux to glide in the air, jump higher and move faster. If Tux gets hit after he collected a flower, he loses his helmet and transforms back into big Tux. The objective of each level is to get to the end, usually marked by checker-patterned poles.

At the end of each world is a boss, such as the Yeti boss on Icy Island or the Ghosttree on the Forest World.

Contributed Levels

In addition to the two main worlds, there are contributed levels, which include the 4 Bonus Islands, a christmas and hallowen levelsets and a special retro levelset (Revenge in Redmond) designed to celebrate the game's 20th anniversary (2020). In addition to these, there are installable addons and custom levels added by the player, either created in the internal Level Editor or added manually.

Add-on levels
There are additional add-on levels in SuperTux which can be installed with the built-in add-on manager or manually. The add-on manager lists over 25 add-ons. New add-ons are usually published on the forum or in the Discord server and can be added to the list after testing.

Plot 

In the game, Tux begins in Icy Island. Tux holds a picnic with Penny, his girlfriend. He starts dancing and gets distracted, he doesn't notice that the villain of the game, named Nolok, kidnaps Penny. Once he finds that Penny is missing, and determined to save her, Tux begins his journey. He then navigates the Icy Island and later Forest to find her.

Reception 
In 2007 Punto Informatico described the atmosphere of the game as pleasant and praised the free availability of the game.

In 2008, SuperTux was used as a game for children by school district #73 in British Columbia, which had decided to transition to free and open-source software.

Also in 2008, SuperTux was bundled in the Linux Caixa Mágica distribution, known for its inclusion in the Portuguese Magalhães computer.

The game was ported to other platforms, including GP2X, Pocket PC, PSP, and Palm WebOS. The game was also scheduled to be included in the release of the EVO Smart Console as of April 2009.

In May 2017 download portal Softpedia lists for the Linux version alone over 80,000 downloads, Softonic over 750,000 downloads for the Windows version. Between 2002 and May 2017 SuperTux aggregated also over 850,000 downloads via SourceForge.net.

Currently, SuperTux has more than 1,000,000 downloads on Google Play and 36,500 downloads on CNET

See also

Secret Maryo Chronicles
Mari0
List of open-source video games

References

External links

 Official SuperTux website
 
 Download stable or development snapshots
 Review and screen shots of Milestone 1 at HeadshotGamer.com

2004 video games
BeOS games
GP2X games
Linux games
Open-source video games
Platform games
MacOS games
Video games developed in the United States
Video games set in Antarctica
Video game clones
Windows games
Single-player video games